Built Games, LLC is an independent video game developer and publisher founded in December 8, 2014 by Michael Pagano Doom, and is based in Los Angeles, California.

The company gained notoriety when their first mobile game, Little Dictator, was released in February, 2015. When it was initially submitted, Apple rejected it due to its controversial subject matter and the way the game poked fun at North Korea's leader Kim Jong-un.

History 
Built Games was founded in late 2014 by Michael Pagano, who was a former producer and studio head at EA and Zynga. Pagano's former Warner Bros. colleagues Kevin McKinney and Jay Guevarra joined the company respectively as Co-Founder, COO and Partner, VP Strategy in late 2015. On November 12, 2015 Built Games published Super Nitro Chimp, which was developed by C2 Game Studio.

In partnership with DHX Media, Teletubbies Play Time, an app for toddlers was released on June 22, 2017 in the U.S. and Philippines, and worldwide on December 10, 2017.

On October 13, 2016 Wyld Stallyns, an RPG title based on the Bill and Ted universe was announced and was released in November 2018. On 6/9/17, to celebrate the duo's favorite numeral combination, Built Games launched a 69 minutes of 69 promotion where a contest winner was selected to be included as a playable character.

In partnership with Comedy Central, Broad City: High Score, a mobile game based on the show created by Ilana Glazer and Abbi Jacobson was released worldwide on April 20, 2018.

Games published

External links

References

American companies established in 2014
2014 establishments in California
Indie video game developers
Video game companies of the United States
Video game companies established in 2014
Companies based in Los Angeles
Video game development companies